a.k.a. Girls Hand in Hand (USA title) is a 1952 black-and-white Japanese film directed by Shigeo Nakaki.

Plot 
A girl (Margaret O'Brien) visits her dad in Japan, and she makes friends with an orphan from the war. She then tries to raise money to make an orphanage.

Cast 
 Hibari Misora as Maria Abe
 Hikaru Hoshi
 Mitsuko Miura
 Tetsu Nakamura
 John Norton
 Margaret O'Brien
 Shiko Saito
 Nobuko Shingu
 Kyoji Sugi
 Yuko Tashiro
 Eiran Yoshikawa

See also
 List of films in the public domain in the United States

References

External links 
 https://www.imdb.com/title/tt0416757/
  (public domain)

Japanese black-and-white films
1952 films
Daiei Film films
Japanese drama films
1952 drama films
1950s Japanese films